The 49th Venice Biennale, held in 2001, was an exhibition of international contemporary art, with 65 participating nations. The Venice Biennale takes place biennially in Venice, Italy. Prizewinners of the 49th Biennale included: Richard Serra and Cy Twombly (lifetime achievement), Janet Cardiff and George Bures Miller, Marisa Merz, Pierre Huyghe (International Prize), and Germany (best national participation).

Awards 

 Golden Lion for lifetime achievement: Richard Serra and Cy Twombly
 Golden Lion for best national participation: Germany
 International Prize: Janet Cardiff and George Bures Miller, Marisa Merz, Pierre Huyghe
 Special award: Yinka Shonibare, Tiong Ang, Samuel Beckett/Marin Karmitz, Juan Downey
 Special awards for young artists: Federico Herrero, Anri Sala, John Pilson, Al-53167
 Premia Fondazione Panathlon Domenico Chiesa: Urs Lüthi

References

Bibliography

Further reading 

 
 
 
 
 
 
 
 
 
 
 

2001 in art
2001 in Italy
Venice Biennale exhibitions